Dan Bern (also known as Bernstein; born July 27, 1959) is an American guitarist, singer, songwriter, novelist and painter. His music has been compared to that of Bob Dylan, Woody Guthrie, Bruce Springsteen, Phil Ochs and Elvis Costello.

He is a prolific composer, having written over one thousand songs. He wrote the novel Quitting Science (2004) under the pen name Cunliffe Merriwether and wrote the preface under his own name.

Themes

Bern's song "Talkin' Woody, Bob, Bruce, and Dan Blues," from the album Smartie Mine, offers a joking take on this influence, presented in the style of a Guthrie or Dylan talking blues song, and containing a spoof of a Springsteen song as well.  When asked about the similarity between himself and Dylan, he once quipped, "I guess Bob Dylan was sort of the Dan Bern of the '60's."  Bernstein has toured with Ani DiFranco.  He is known for sardonic, literary lyrics, a range of musical styles, and a folk music style paired with rock instrumentation.

Although a vein of social and political humor runs through even his earliest work, 
Bern's songs became more explicitly political during the 2004 US presidential election campaign, with songs such as "Bush Must Be Defeated" and "President" highlighting his sometimes surreal political takes. His work often deals with his Lithuanian Jewish ancestry, as in songs like "Lithuania." The name Bernstein is a reference to this ancestry; on a trip to Lithuania, he learned it was his family's name before immigration to the United States.

Between 1997 and 2003 many of his tours and recordings  featured a regular cast of backup musicians which he began calling the International Jewish Banking Conspiracy or IJBC, which Bern said was a tribute to the book Nigger by Dick Gregory. New American Language, The Swastika EP, Fleeting Days and My Country II were all released under the "Dan Bern & the International Jewish Banking Conspiracy" name.  The IJBC featured longtime Bern producer and collaborator Wil Masisak on keyboards, drums, guitar and bass; Eben "Eby Brown" Grace on guitar and pedal steel; Brian "Slim Nickel" Schey on bass and guitar; Paul Kuhn on cellocaster; Anna Phoebe on electric violin; and drummers Colin "Spanky" Mahoney and Jake Coffin.

In early 2007, Bern's Breathe won in The 6th Annual Independent Music Awards for Best Folk/Singer-Songwriter Album.

In 2009, 2010 and 2012, Bern played with Common Rotation from Los Angeles, California  which consists of vocals, guitar, banjo, trumpet, saxophone, and other instruments. Their concert in September 2009 at the M Bar in Los Angeles, was released as a live album in the spring of 2010 called "Live in Los Angeles"  with about half the songs Bern playing solo and the other half including Common Rotation.

Bern's songwriting skills were used in the biopic parody film Walk Hard where he helped write 16 songs for the movie. Many of these songs made the theatrical cut of the film including the Dylanesque "Royal Jelly," and the melodic "(Have You Heard the News) Dewey Cox Died."  He continues to write songs for films, including Get Him to the Greek and Father's Day. Bern's song "One Dance" was also included in Kasdan's first film, Zero Effect. Bern wrote "Swing Set," a duet with Emmylou Harris, for the off Broadway production of Family Week (directed by Jonathan Demme), and wrote the title song for Demme's documentary Jimmy Carter: Man From Plains.

In 2012, Bern released two studio recordings of American roots music: Drifter, featuring a duet with Emmylou Harris, and Doubleheader, an 18-song tribute to baseball culled from close to 30 years of songwriting and recorded at Bob Weir's TRI Studios in Marin County.

In 2004, Bern published the novel Quitting Science  and, in 2012, Cleaver the Gronk under the pen name Cunliffe Merriwether.

An avid baseball fan, Bern has written several baseball songs including "Johnny Sylvester Comes Back to Visit the Babe" in which he put words to music to the story of Babe Ruth and Johnny Sylvester.

In 2019, Bern released the album Regent Street.

Life
Bern learned to play cello at age six, and the guitar at 14 or 16, after he heard  his first Bob Dylan songs.

After college, he played seven open mics a week in Chicago and started to be invited to Chicago folk clubs such as The Earl of Old Town, Holstein's and The No Exit.

In 1991, he lived in Hollywood, taught tennis in Encino to make a living as a songwriter. The junior scouts from the major record companies “were coming around".
Bern is married to Danielle Lesniewski. They have a daughter and lived in Los Angeles until 2016 before moving eastward for family reasons.

Discography

Studio albums
 Dog Boy Van (EP; 1996)
 Dan Bern (1997)
 Fifty Eggs (1998)
 Smartie Mine (double album; 1998)
 New American Language (2001)
 World Cup (EP; 2002)
 The Swastika EP (EP; 2002)
 Fleeting Days (2003)
 My Country II (EP; 2004)
 Anthems (EP; 2004)
 Breathe Easy (EP; 2006)
 Breathe (2006)
 Moving Home (2008)
 Two Feet Tall (2009)
 Live in Los Angeles (2010)
 Live in New York (2011)
 Drifter (2012)
 Doubleheader (2012)
 Wilderness Song (2012)
 Three Feet Tall (2015)
 Hoody (2015)
 Adderal Holiday (2016)
 Regent Street (2019)
 Ivan's Barbershop (2020)
 Shining (EP; 2020)

Albums available on iTunes and eMusic

 Divine and Conquer (1994; released 2007)
 The Burbank Tapes (1998; released in 2007)
 Macaroni Cola  (2000–2001; released in 2007)
 Songs of Fall (2014)

References

External links

 Dan Bern's website
 Messenger Records Dan Bern website
 
 Dan Bern collection at the Internet Archive's live music archive

1965 births
Living people
People from Mount Vernon, Iowa
Jewish American musicians
Jewish American writers
Jewish American artists
American folk singers
American male singer-songwriters
Jewish American songwriters
Fast Folk artists
Cooking Vinyl artists
Independent Music Awards winners
American people of Lithuanian-Jewish descent
Jewish folk singers
21st-century American Jews
Singer-songwriters from Iowa